Wyllis is both a surname and a given name. Notable people with the name include:

People with the surname
Francis Wyllis (died 1597), English academic administrator and dean
George Wyllis (1590–1645), American governor
Mason Wyllis Collegiate American football player

People with the given name
Wyllis Cooper (1899–1955), American writer and producer
Edward Wyllis Scripps (1854–1926), American newspaper publisher

See also
Willis (disambiguation)